Frances Gillian Abrams (born 1963) is a British investigative journalist for BBC Radio 4, and non-fiction author. Earlier in her career she was a journalist for The Independent.

Early life and education
Abrams was born and brought up in Stockport, where she attended Marple Hall County High School. She studied sociology at the University of York then took a one-year course in journalism in Sheffield.

Career
Her first job in journalism was with the Birmingham Post and Mail group where she first reported on education, going on to be education correspondent for The Sunday Times, The Sunday Correspondent, The Sunday Telegraph and lastly The Independent, where she later switched to reporting on national politics.

Abrams left The Independent in 2000, since when she has made investigative programmes for BBC Radio 4's File on 4 and written features for The Guardian.

Personal life
Abrams lives in Snape, Suffolk where she runs a small chocolate making business using honey from the bees which she keeps.

Publications
Below the Breadline: Living on the Minimum Wage, 18 July 2002, Profile Books,  
Freedom's Cause: Lives of the Suffragettes, 2003, Profile Books, 
Seven Kings: How it Feels to be a Teenager, 14 September 2006, Atlantic Books, 
Learning to Fail: How Society Lets Young People Down, 2010, Routledge,  
Songs of Innocence: The Story of British Childhood, 1 November 2012, Atlantic Books,

References

1963 births
Living people
British investigative journalists
BBC Radio 4 presenters
The Independent people
Writers from Stockport
Alumni of the University of York
People educated at Marple Hall School
People from Suffolk Coastal (district)